Dance Camp is an American comedy-drama web film produced exclusively for YouTube Red as an original film, directed by Bert & Bertie and written by Nick Turner and Rex New. The film was released on February 10, 2016. The film is produced by AwesomenessTV.

Premise 
The plot is about Hunter (Nadji Jeter) who is sent to a dance camp, where he meets a bunch of eclectic misfits. He is eventually inspired to take down a rival dance group led by Lance (Jake Paul) and along the way also falls in love with Cheyenne (Meg DeAngelis).

Cast 

 Meg DeAngelis as Cheyenne
 Nadji Jeter as Hunter
 Jake Paul as Lance
 Niki and Gabi as Mya and Mia

References

External links 

 

YouTube Premium films
2016 films
2016 comedy-drama films
2016 comedy films
Awesomeness Films films
2016 directorial debut films